The Tippmann C-3 was the first propane powered paintball marker. It operates on a unique system Tippmann calls 'Propane Enhanced Performance'. The name 'C-3' may refer to the chemical formula of propane, C3H8.

Operation 
While traditional Paintball markers rely upon the expansion of an inert compressed gas (namely  or air) for Paintball propulsion, the C-3 utilises the energy released in propane combustion.

This is a simplified explanation of the C-3's firing system:

The C-3 operates on a closed bolt system. As the pump is pulled back by the shooter, the bolt moves back to allow one paintball to fall into the breech.

As the shooter returns the pump to the forward position, completing the pumpstroke, propane is drawn into the combustion chamber. The bolt also moves forward, sealing the breech, and bringing the paintball into the firing position.

After the pump stroke, the shooter pulls the trigger, causing a spark and igniting the propane. The resulting expansion of gases forces a piston forward, which in turn compresses air behind the ball, propelling the paintball forward.

Advantages of Propane 

Performance - Since combustion releases a great deal of energy compared to expansion, the C-3 is able to get up to 50,000 shots from one 16oz tank of propane, over 60 times the amount from a comparable  or compressed air tank.

Price - Disposable 16oz propane tanks are readily available at discount, grocery, and hardware stores for around $3.00 and deliver approximately 50,000 shots - a single disposable tank may well outlast the marker. In contrast, reusable  tanks cost $5 – $25 and compressed air tanks $35 – $200, delivering 300 to 1200 shots per refill.

Simplicity - Due to it being just that, a propane canister, one can make a "remote line" using a standard propane hose.

Disadvantages Of Propane 

Heat - A large amount of waste heat is produced. This is the main problem with creating a self-loading combustion powered paintball marker.

Further developments 
 describes a semi-automatic propane-powered Paintball marker. Operation is similar to that of a reversed C-3 mechanism, with the pump being replaced with a return spring and heavy piston. Pressure produced from the ignited propane pushes the piston forward, which opens a poppet valve and releases exhaust gases into the barrel. The piston continues forward under its own momentum, bounces off the spring and returns to its starting position.

It is unlikely that the self-loading version described in the patent will be produced, due to excess heat production.

See also
Paintball
Paintball marker
Stock paintball
Tippmann
Woodsball

External links
Propane VS /Nitro Comparison (PDF) 

Paintball markers